The Chief Post Office or Christchurch Central Post Office, originally known as the Government Building, is located in Cathedral Square, Christchurch, New Zealand. The building was initially a post office with other government services. Until the 2011 Christchurch earthquake, it was a Visitor Information Centre but has since been inaccessible, but is planned to reopen in 2023 as The Grand a mixed use building that will include restaurants, shops, an office & a Visitor Information Centre. It was the site of the first telephone exchange in New Zealand. The structure is registered with Heritage New Zealand as a Category I heritage building.

Geography

The building is located at 31 Cathedral Square, and is situated in the Square's southwest corner. Footpaths and a cabstand were added after the post office opened. During the 1992 redesign and redevelopment process of the Square, the road in front of the former Chief Post Office was closed.

History
In 1863, the New Zealand House of Representatives noted an important change was to take place in Canterbury, in that Christchurch would replace Lyttelton as the principal post town. The General Government was renting several government buildings in Canterbury, some of which were inconveniently situated or badly constructed. Christchurch's first post office was very small, and located at Market Square, these days known as Victoria Square. 

The Canterbury Provincial Council, with the sanction of the General Government, agreed to erect government buildings in Cathedral Square, opposite the Anglican Church's building site. A Bill passed in 1873 vested the site in the Crown. Plans were drawn by William Henry Clayton, the first (and only) Colonial Architect to New Zealand. Clayton had previously designed the (former) post office in Lyttelton, and that building, smaller but similar in style, is regarded as his "trial run" for the building in the Square. While it was agreed that the new building should accommodate the General Government, opinions differed on whether the construction should be ornamental. A prevailing motion approved that some regard ought to be paid to a little architectural finish.

The construction contract was awarded to Daniel Reese. The foundation stone was laid by Hon Edward Richardson, a Christchurch member of parliament who until earlier in the year had been the first Minister of Public Works, on Queen's Birthday on 24 May 1877. The event was poorly attended, partly because no programme had been arranged beforehand. In his speech, Richardson reflected on the lengthy delay of starting construction, owing to the controversy about the building site. The mayor, Fred Hobbs, then used his address to lobby the attending members of parliament for a Resident Magistrate's Court (which was built in 1880/81). Since nobody came forward to speak afterwards, the crowd dispersed. Attendees of the ceremony were Bishop Harper, MHR William Rolleston, MHR Edward Stevens and MHR William Montgomery.

Soon after laying the foundation stone, Clayton died and the work was supervised by his assistant Pierre Finch Martineau Burrows. The building was completed in 1878. It opened behind schedule on 14 July 1879.

The building originally housed the postal department as well as other Government and administration offices. In 1881, New Zealand's first telephone exchange was installed in the building. The building was extended in 1907 to the west by adding a third gable; up until that point, it had two symmetrical façades. The extension was designed and supervised by Burrows. When the new Government Building opened at the eastern end of the Square in 1913, the postal services remained and the building became known as the Chief Post Office.

In the 1930s, the post office was threatened by demolition, as more space was required. Construction of a new post office didn't start until 1989, immediately to the south of the existing building. The seven-storey building dominates and impairs the historic structure, and parts of the old building had to be demolished to make way for the high rise.

The building suffered minimal damage in the 2010 Canterbury earthquake, and only minor damage in the February 2011 Christchurch earthquake. The landlord, Gordon Chamberlain, director of Chrystal Imports, feared that necessary repair to or demolition of nearby high-rise buildings would restrict access to his buildings for "years". Of the four other central city buildings owned by Crystal Imports, two were demolished, including Warner's Hotel on the opposite side of the Square.

It was announced in 2020 that the building would be restored into a hospitality & visitor complex called The Grand which would occupy the entire building it hoped to open in 2021. The opening of the complex was delayed due to COVID-19 & failed fundraising but in June 2022 the crowd funding goal was met and would open in August 2022 but that date was pushed back again and it is planned to open sometime in March 2023.

Architecture and fittings

Built of brick, the design is Italianate style with classical and Venetian Gothic elements. The upper windows feature pointed arches. A later renovation brought a third gabled bay to the north frontage. The building is registered with the New Zealand Historic Places Trust as a Category I heritage item, with the registration number 291.

Clock
Reputed to be a replica of London's Great Clock of Westminster, a working, free standing, four faced turret clock was installed in 1879 within a clock tower. Underneath the east facing clock face is the Royal coat of arms of the United Kingdom. Notable for being unreliable, an electric clock was eventually installed to control the visible faces as slave clocks. While at one time it chimed on the hour and at the quarters, after the mechanisms were damaged in a 1980s fire, the clock became silent.

References

External links

 SketchUp 3D modelling tool of Old Chief Post Office, New Visitor Information Centre

Government buildings completed in 1878
1878 establishments in New Zealand
Former post office buildings
Heritage New Zealand Category 1 historic places in Canterbury, New Zealand
Buildings and structures in Christchurch
Cathedral Square, Christchurch
2011 Christchurch earthquake
Visitor centers
Tourist attractions in Christchurch
1870s architecture in New Zealand
William Clayton (architect) buildings